Adrián Iaies (born November 4, 1960) is an Argentine pianist and composer who has been nominated for the Latin Grammy awards three times. His main style is jazz but he combines that with soul, tango, and other styles.

Iaies became involved in jazz fusion in the mid-1980s. His 1999 album Las Tardecitas de Minton's ("Evenings at Minton's"), received a nomination for a Latin Grammy.

References

External links
 Official Site

Argentine composers
Argentine jazz pianists
Musicians from Buenos Aires
1960 births
Living people
Place of birth missing (living people)
20th-century Argentine male artists
21st-century Argentine male artists
20th-century composers
21st-century composers
21st-century pianists